The Hyundai i30 is a small family car manufactured by the South Korean manufacturer Hyundai Motor Company since 2007. The i30 shares its platform with the Kia Ceed, available as a three-door hatchback (2012–2017), five-door hatchback, five-door estate and five-door liftback (2017–present), with a choice of three petrol engines and two diesel engines, either with manual or automatic transmission.

The i30 is marketed alongside the fifth-generation Hyundai Elantra in the United States and Canada initially as the Elantra Touring before being renamed as Elantra GT. The second-generation i30 was introduced in September 2011 at the Frankfurt Motor Show.



First generation (FD; 2007) 

The first generation Hyundai i30 was conceived in Rüsselsheim, Germany, at Hyundai's Design and Technical Centre.

The i30 scored a 4.2 on the Euro NCAP crash tests for the 2008 model, and is an improvement on the 3.9 scored during the 2007 model.

The i30 awarded the full five star safety rating by the Australasian New Car Assessment Program.

The i30 named as safest imported mid size car in Argentina.

The first generation i30 was officially launched in Malaysia in July 2009 where two engines were available: 1.6L (manual and auto) and 2.0L (auto only).

i30cw
The i30 hatchback was introduced at the Geneva Motor Show in March 2007, and released in July 2007 for Europe and Australia. The i30cw (a.k.a. i30 estate, also known as Elantra Touring) was released in South Korea at the Seoul Motor Show in 2007, and is marketed worldwide under slightly different names. This model also entered the North American market for the model year of 2009, as the Elantra Touring. It is a larger, roomier version of the i30 hatchback.

The American EPA rates consumption at 23 MPG in the city and 30 MPG on the highway (10 L/100 km and 7.8 L/100 km respectively). The Elantra Touring comes equipped with either a five-speed manual transmission without hill assist feature or a four-speed torque-converter non-manumatic automatic transmission.

The Hyundai Elantra Touring was originally available in either Base or Limited trim, each offering a similar level of equipment to its Hyundai Elantra sedan counterpart. Later the model names were changed to GLS and SE, with the SE being the more equipped model.

The i30cw/Elantra Touring scored high on the United States National Highway Traffic Safety Administration crash tests:
 Frontal Crash: 
 Side Crash: 
 Roll Over:

i30 blue

The i30 blue is a variation with Start&Stop technology (called Idle Stop and Go). United Kingdom versions came with 1.4L, 1.6L petrol or a 1.6L diesel engine, in both five-door hatchback or estate body styles.  emission rating for the 1.6L petrol models were reduced to 142g/km (from 152g/km).

The car was unveiled at the 2009 Geneva Motor Show, and was produced in Nosovice, Czech Republic. It went on sale in the United Kingdom in January 2008. and had ISG as an option, costing £200.

Reception
In Australia, the Hyundai i30 won the 'Best Mid size Car Under $28,000'. At the time of its release in the end of 2007, the 1.6L CRDi i30 was the cheapest diesel car in Australia, coming in at just $21,490AUD for the basic (SX) model. The model above (SLX) adds Climate Control, trip computer, leather gear knob and steering wheel (with audio controls), cruise control (from 2008), body colour door handles, rear armrest with cup holders, six speakers (up from four), adjustable lumbar support for the driver, fog lights and 16" alloy wheels. Australian i30 models feature a unique suspension tune for Australian road conditions.

2007

Car of the Year for 2007 by Carsguide with the 1.6L CRDi model winning the Green Car of the Year award.

Hyundai's i30 Diesel Picked as Australia's Car of the Year.

2008

'Best Mid-size Car Under $28,000' by Australia's Best Cars to the Hyundai i30 SX petrol and i30 CRDi Turbo Diesel 

The Hyundai i30 was chosen as 2008 Car of the Year in Spain.

2009

Best Family Hatch in New Zealand

The Hyundai i30 was judged the Supreme Winner in the 2009 AA Motoring Excellence Awards in New Zealand.

2010

Most Satisfying Car In Britain.

The i30 won the Driver Power Top 100 survey to be named by owners as the most satisfying car to own. Auto Express magazine surveyed the reliability and satisfaction survey, completed by over 23,000 drivers.

The Hyundai Elantra Touring Named Top 10 Family Cars by Kelley Blue Book (KBB) in the United States.

2012

Best Family Car. The i30 won the Best Family Car of the Year on 14 October 2012, at the Glasgow Thistle.

Engines

Transmissions
Choices include a five-speed manual, six-speed manual (1.6 CRDi U2 and 2.0 CRDi), or four-speed automatic transmission. Automatic transmissions are available with 1.6 petrol, 2.0 petrol, 1.6 CRDi (116PS) models.

Second generation (GD; 2011) 

Hyundai unveiled its next generation i30 at the 2011 Frankfurt International Motor Show. The new i30 was designed and engineered at the Hyundai Motor Europe Technical Centre in Rüsselsheim, Germany, and offers a choice of four engines with a total of six power options and  emissions below 100 g/km due to an upgraded 1.6-litre diesel unit. The next generation i30 went on sale in Europe early in 2012, as a five-door hatchback. It is produced in Europe at the company's manufacturing facility in Nošovice, Czech Republic.

It was launched in South Korea since October 20, 2011, and it is the second model under Hyundai's Premium Youth Lab brand. The new Korean spec i30 is offered with a 1.6-litre Gamma GDi engine and a 1.6L VGT diesel engine.

The second generation i30 became available in the United States in the summer of 2012 for the 2013 model year, as the Hyundai Elantra GT, replacing the Elantra Touring nameplate. It made a premiere at the 2012 Chicago Auto Show, along with the new Hyundai Elantra Coupe, featuring the same 1.8-litre Nu MPI engine as the original Elantra MD sedan. In 2014, the 1.8L is replaced by the 2,0L Nu GDI engine, due to critics' opinions that the 1.8-litre wasn't sporty enough for the GT moniker. Available in a single trim level, the Elantra GT offered several different option packages which added additional features. A glass panoramic roof is available as an option.

In Malaysia, the second generation i30 was previewed during the 2013 Kuala Lumpur International Motor Show and officially launched in March 2014. For Malaysia, the i30 used a 1.8L engine and a torsion beam setup for the rear suspension.

i30 Estate
An estate, or wagon, version of the second-generation i30 was premiered at the 2012 Geneva Motor Show. This model is also known as the i30 Tourer in some markets.

The wagon shares the same wheelbase as the hatchback and adds 185 mm in length. The increased length yields an extra 150 litres of boot capacity, taking the total to 528 litres. With the rear seats folded, the total cargo capacity is 1,642 litres, an increase of 326 litres over the hatch.

i30 three-door
Introduced in the beginning of 2013, the aim of the three-door version is to attract younger buyers to the i30. The grille is given a more aggressive look than the five-door model.

i30 Turbo
In 2015, Hyundai introduced hot hatch version of the i30.

Pre-facelift

First facelift

Second facelift

Engines

2015 facelift engines

Third generation (PD; 2016) 

Hyundai unveiled the third generation i30 at the 2016 Paris Motor Show. The car introduced a new design language for the brand called "Cascading grille". It is launched for North American market in 2017 as 2018 model as Elantra GT. For the 2019 model year, for European markets only, Hyundai standardized the i30 Fastback front design, for all i30 versions. (Excluding the i30 N-line and i30N models)

The Hyundai i30 Fastback replaced Elantra in EU markets where it was being sold until Autumn 2017, where it was being presented at the Frankfurt Motor Show.

Elantra GT 
In some markets, the third-generation Hyundai i30 Hatchback is also sold as the Hyundai Elantra GT. In the U.S., the Elantra GT is available in two distinct models: Elantra GT and Elantra GT Sport.

This engine is shared with the standard Hyundai Elantra Sedan. This engine is the same engine as equipped in the Kia Forte Hatchback SX Turbo and the Kia Soul Exclaim (!) Turbo. Transmission choices for the Elantra GT are a standard six-speed manual transmission, or an optional six-speed automatic transmission. Transmission choices for the Elantra GT Sport include a standard six-speed manual transmission, or an optional seven-speed Dual Clutch automatic (DCT) transmission. "Drive Mode Select" is standard on cars equipped with either the automatic transmission, or the Dual Clutch (DCT) automatic transmission. Fuel economy ratings (estimated by the EPA) are as follows.

According to the Car and Driver, the GT Sport fell "short of delivering the buttoned-down refinement found in the class leaders when attacking twisting tarmac" and its body leans more than they would like in turns, "the electrically assisted steering lacks the precision and feel of the Honda Civic Sport hatchback and the GTI".

For 2019, the Elantra GT Sport was replaced with the Elantra GT N-Line. The N-Line trim is similar to the previous Sport trim with slightly different styling cues. The Elantra GT N-Line is similar to that of the i30 N-Line.

The Elantra GT was discontinued in the US for the 2021 model year. Hyundai directed buyers to its Venue and Kona crossovers instead, as well as the updated Elantra sedan and Veloster.

Engines

i30N

Facelift (2020) 

The updated Hyundai i30 range including the N Line Wagon was revealed in February 2020. Features include slimmer LED headlamps, 18-inch alloy wheels, 7-inch digital instrument cluster, 10.25-inch touchscreen infotainment system, and Hyundai SmartSense advanced safety package.

The 1.0-litre T-GDI and 1.5-litre T-GDI engines are coupled with a 48-volt mild hybrid technology.

i30 Sedan 

The Hyundai Elantra (CN7) is sold as the i30 sedan in Australia, leveraging the use of the widely known "i30" nameplate there.

Motorsport
Gabriele Tarquini won the 2018 World Touring Car Cup driving an i30 N, winning five races. His teammate Norbert Michelisz won a further championship in 2019.

A version of the i30 was developed for Next Generation Touring Car regulations for competition in the British Touring Car Championship, with its debut coming in 2020. This version of the car was titled the "i30 Fastback N Performance." The BTCC version of the car saw success, with Tom Ingram driving the car to the series championship in 2022.

Sales

References

External links

2010s cars
Cars introduced in 2007
Cars of the Czech Republic
Compact cars
Euro NCAP small family cars
Hatchbacks
I30
Station wagons